Inauguration of the Pleasure Dome is a 38-minute avant-garde short film by Kenneth Anger. It was filmed in December 1953 and completed in 1954. Anger created two other versions of this film in 1966 and the late 1970s. According to him, the film takes the name "pleasure dome" from Samuel Taylor Coleridge's atmospheric 1816 poem Kubla Khan. Anger was inspired to make the film after attending a Halloween party called "Come as your Madness". The film has gained cult film status.

Earlier prints of the film had sequences that were meant to be projected on three different screens, an idea inspired in part by Abel Gance's 1927 film Napoléon. The three-screen version was shown at the Brussels World's Fair. Anger subsequently re-edited the film to layer the images. The film (primarily in the second or third version) was often shown in American universities and art galleries during the 1960s, 1970s and 1980s.

The original edition soundtrack is a complete performance of Glagolitic Mass by the Czech composer Leoš Janáček (1854–1928). In 1966, a re-edited version known as 'The Sacred Mushroom Edition' was made available. In the late 1970s, a third revision was made, which was 'The Sacred Mushroom Edition' re-edited to fit the Electric Light Orchestra album Eldorado, omitting only "Illusions in G Major", a blues-rock tune that Anger felt did not fit the mood of the film.

The differences in the visuals of the 1954 original and the two revisions are minor. An early version—shown only once on German television in the early 1980s, and held to this day by NDR—includes an additional three minutes at the beginning, including a reading of the poem "Kubla Khan" by Samuel Taylor Coleridge.

The film reflects Anger's deep interest in Thelema, the philosophy of Aleister Crowley and his followers, as indicated by Marjorie Cameron's role as "The Scarlet Woman" (an honorific Crowley bestowed on certain of his important magical partners). Crowley's concept of a ritual masquerade party where attendees dress as gods and goddesses served as a direct inspiration for the film.

The film uses some footage of the Hell sequence from the 1911 Italian silent film L'Inferno. Near the end, scenes from Anger's 1949 film Puce Moment are interpolated into the layered images and faces.

The film was screened at the Coronet in Los Angeles in 1954.

Cast
 Samson De Brier as Shiva, Osiris, Nero, Alessandro Cagliostro, and Aleister Crowley (credited as "The Great Beast 666")
 Marjorie Cameron as The Scarlet Woman and Kali
 Joan Whitney as Aphrodite
 Katy Kadell as Isis
 Renate Druks as Lilith
 Anaïs Nin as Astarte
 Curtis Harrington as Cesare the sleepwalker
 Kenneth Anger as Hecate
 Paul Mathison as Pan
 Peter Loomer as Ganymede

See also
 List of avant-garde films of the 1950s

References

Bibliography

External links

1950s avant-garde and experimental films
1954 films
1954 short films
Films directed by Kenneth Anger
American short films
1950s American films